Riverview may refer to:

Australia
Riverview, New South Wales, a suburb of Sydney
Riverview, Queensland, a suburb of Ipswich

Canada
Riverview, Alberta
Riverview, Edmonton, Alberta
Riverview, New Brunswick
Riverview (electoral district), New Brunswick
Riverview, Ottawa, Ontario
Riverview, St. Catharines, Ontario
Riverview (Gatineau), a historic house in Quebec

United States
Riverview, Alabama, a community
Riverview, Arkansas, a place in Arkansas
Riverview, California (disambiguation)
Riverview, Colorado, a place in Colorado
Riverview, Delaware
Riverview, Florida (disambiguation)
Riverview, Indiana
Riverview, Kentucky (disambiguation)
Riverview, Maryland (disambiguation)
Riverview, Newaygo County, Michigan
Riverview, Michigan, in Wayne County
Riverview, Mississippi
Riverview, Missouri (disambiguation)
Riverview, Nebraska
Riverview, New York, a place in New York
Riverview, North Carolina
Riverview, Ohio (disambiguation)
a former name of Tower on the Maumee, Toledo, Ohio, listed on the National Register of Historic Places (NRHP) in Lucas County
Riverview, Oregon (disambiguation)
Riverview, South Carolina
Riverview (Clarksville, Tennessee), listed on the NRHP in Montgomery County
Riverview, Virginia (disambiguation)
Riverview, Wisconsin, a town
Riverview (community), Wisconsin, an unincorporated community
Riverview, Wyoming

Historic houses
 Riverview (Columbus, Mississippi), U.S.
 Riverview at Hobson Grove, in Bowling Green, Kentucky, U.S.
 Riverview House, in Vassalboro, Maine, U.S.
 Riverview House, West Ryde, in West Ryde, New South Wales, Australia

Other uses
 Riverview, a downloadable world for The Sims 3

See also

Riverview High School (disambiguation)
Riverview Hospital (disambiguation)
Riverview Park (disambiguation)
Riverfront